The Toronto Falcons were a soccer team based in Toronto, Ontario, Canada. They played only two years, 1967 in the National Professional Soccer League (NPSL) and 1968 in the North American Soccer League (NASL). Their home field was Varsity Stadium.

During the 1967 season, while still in the NPSL, the Falcons drew an average of 3,792 people per game. Toronto's record for the 1967 season was a bearable 10-5-17. The following season, the NPSL merged with the United Soccer Association to form the NASL. Their intercity rival, Toronto City, of USL folded in the process after only one year.

In the NASL, with the legendary László Kubala as their coach, the Falcons played well collecting a 13-6-13 record, but financial troubles caused the club (along with 11 others) to fold. Their average attendance for the 1968 season was 5,336 people per game. The NASL would return to Toronto in 1971 in the form of the Toronto Metros.

Year-by-year

Players
During the 1967 season, the Falcons were able to sign Bill Brown a Scottish goalkeeper who drew 28 caps in his career. Tony Lecce was a defender and Canadian international. Defender Guglielmo Burelli played over 150 games in the Serie A, including one season for Juventus F.C. Other players worth noting are Iris DeBrito and Yanko Daucik both prolific goal scorers, and John Lima from the first Spanish league. The team became something of a family affair with the addition of Daucik's brother in law László Kubala (player/coach) and nephew Branko Kubala to the squad, not to mention Yanko's father Ferdinand Daučík served as the head coach. In 1968, Salvadoran international Raúl Magaña appeared for the club.

Coaches
 Fernando Daucik
 Hector Marinaro, Sr.
   László Kubala

References

Association football clubs established in 1967
Defunct soccer clubs in Canada
North American Soccer League (1968–1984) teams
North American Soccer League (1968–1984) teams based in Canada
Fal
National Professional Soccer League (1967) franchises
1967 in Canadian soccer
1968 in Canadian soccer
1967 establishments in Ontario
1968 disestablishments in Ontario